Rena Elrod was a musician and state legislator in the United States. She was born in Attica, Indiana and studied music. She was a leader of women’s clubs. A Republican, she won a seat in the Illinois House of Representatives after a recount in 1924. She was one of a small number of women then serving in the Illinois legislature.

References

See also
Lottie Holman O’Neill
Katherine Hancock Goode
Florence Fifer Bohrer
Flora Cheney

20th-century American politicians
20th-century American women musicians
Republican Party members of the Illinois House of Representatives
People from Attica, Indiana
Year of birth missing
20th-century American women politicians
Musicians from Illinois
Women state legislators in Illinois
Year of death missing
20th-century American musicians
Musicians from Indiana